Diane Gadoury Hamelin is a Canadian politician. She was a Parti Québécois member of the National Assembly of Quebec for the riding of Masson from 2012 to 2014, first elected in the 2012 election.

References

Living people
Parti Québécois MNAs
Women MNAs in Quebec
People from Mascouche
21st-century Canadian politicians
21st-century Canadian women politicians
Year of birth missing (living people)